The 2016 COSAFA Under-17 Championship is the 5th edition of the COSAFA U-17 Championship, an association football tournament organised by the Council of Southern Africa Football Associations (COSAFA) involving teams from Southern Africa for players aged 17 and below. It took place in Mauritius from 22 to 31 July 2016.

All times shown in this article are in Mauritius Time (UTC+4).

Participating teams

Venues

Group stage

Group A

Group B

Knockout stage

Bracket

Semi-finals

Third place playoff

Final

Notes

References

COSAFA Under-17 Championship
2016 in African football
Cos
International association football competitions hosted by Mauritius